The Tetragoniomycetaceae are a family of fungi in the order Trichosporonales. The family currently contains four genera. Several species are only known from their yeast states.

References

Tremellomycetes
Tetragoniomycetaceae
Taxa named by Franz Oberwinkler
Taxa described in 1981